Spiced vinegar is a type of Philippine vinegar condiment that is made of vinegar e.g. fermented coconut sap infused with spices primarily bird's eye chili and garlic. 

A variation of spiced vinegar was popularized  by Rene Jose B. Stuart del Rosario of Iligan City in 2000 where the spices are finely chopped possibly with the use of a blender or food processor. This is now a mass-produced product under the brand name Sukang Pinakurat (derived from the Cebuano word kurat, meaning to "surprise" or "frighten"). Due to its popularity, the Stuart del Rosario family in 2004 had registered trademarks for sukang pinakurat, sukang waykurat, and sukang kuratsoy with the Intellectual Property Office of the Philippines.

Flavor and uses

In Filipino households, this condiment is used on many assorted dishes, mostly fried dishes (includes lumpiang prito) and lechon.

References

Philippine condiments
Vinegar